Jon Øivind Ness, (born 30 March 1968) is a Norwegian contemporary composer.

Career
During his career, Ness won a 1994 prize from the Norwegian Society of Composers. During the 2000s, he was a two-time winner of the Edvard Prize and a one time Spellemannprisen winner. For the 2012-2013 concert season, Ness was selected as the Oslo Philharmonic Orchestra’s profile composer.

Production

Selected works
 Mumpsimus (2017)
 p.p.w.e.i.  (2016)
 Ætscæke (2015) 
 The Shoots (2014)
 Marmæle (2014)
 Mørkgånga (2014) 
 Mjær (2013)
 My Bloody Mudfish (2013)
 5 arrangements for Diamanda Galas and orchestra (2012)
 Jønjiljo (2012)
 An den langen Lüssen (2010)
 Low Jive (2007)
 Fierce Kentucky Mothers of Doom (2005)
 Dangerous Kitten (1998)
 Dandy Garbage  (1993)
 Schatten (1992)

Discography
 Sverre Riise, Snarks in the kitchen, featured works:  The Dangerous Kitten – for trombone, 3 clarinets and sinfonietta, Moray (The Piece Formerly Known as Phekph Piphtolph) (2015)
 Sverre Riise, Marius Hesby, Magnus Loddgard, Thomas Kjekstad, KORK, Fierce Kentucky Mothers of Doom (2013)
 Ernst Simon Glaser, Zvezdochka in Orbit (2012)
 Peter Herresthal, Catch Light, featured work, Mad Cap Tootlin (2011)
 Twitter Machine, Crossing Patterns (2011)
 Trondheim Sinfonietta, Snowblind (2011)
 Oslo Philharmonic Orchestra, Low Jive (2009)
 Dan Styffe, Bass Trip (2008)
 Arditti Quartet, Ultima Arditti, vol.1, featured work Beware of Darkness (2004)
 MiN Ensemblet, Party Music - Works by Adderley / Harvey / Hellstenius / Ness (2004)
 Stavanger Samtidsensemble, 1-2-3 Happy Happy Happy (2001)
 Saxofon Concentus, Saxofon Concentus (2000)
 Kyberia, Navigations (1999)
 Oslo Sinfonietta, Trondheim Symphony Orchestra, Christian Eggen, Dandy Garbage (1999)
 BIT20 Ensemble, Absolute Pling-Plong – Eight Ways of Making Music (1995)

References

External links
List of Works supplied by the National Library of Norway

1968 births
Norwegian composers
Norwegian male composers
Norwegian guitarists
20th-century composers
People from Inderøy
Living people
20th-century Norwegian male musicians